Sympistis tenuifascia is a moth of the family Noctuidae. It is found in Canada, near the treeline.

The wingspan ranges from 22–26 mm.

External links
 Images at mothphotographersgroup

tenuifascia
Moths described in 1888